Switzerland competed at the 1920 Summer Olympics in Antwerp, Belgium. 77 competitors, all men, took part in 45 events in 13 sports.

Medalists

Gold
 Willy Brüderlin, Max Rudolf, Paul Rudolf, Hans Walter and Paul Staub — Rowing, Men's four with coxswain(4+)
 Robert Roth — Wrestling, Freestyle heavyweight

Silver
 Fritz Hünenberger — Weightlifting, Light heavyweight
 Charles Courant — Wrestling, Freestyle light heavyweight

Bronze
 Édouard Candeveau, Alfred Felber and Paul Piaget — Rowing, Men's pair with coxswain (2+)
 Fritz Zulauf — Shooting, Men's 30m military pistol
 Fritz Kuchen, Albert Tröndle, Arnold Rösli, Walter Lienhard and Caspar Widmer — Shooting, Men's team military rifle, 300m + 600m
 Fritz Zulauf, Joseph Jehle, Gustave Amoudruz, Hans Egli and Domenico Giambonini — Shooting, Men's team 30m military pistol
 Fritz Kuchen — Shooting, Men's 300m military rifle, prone
 Eugène Ryter — Weightlifting, Featherweight

Aquatics

Diving

A single diver represented Switzerland in 1920. It was the nation's debut in the sport. Knuchel competed in the springboard event, but was unable to advance to the final.

 Men

Ranks given are within the semifinal group.

Swimming

Four swimmers, all men, represented Switzerland in 1920. It was the nation's debut in the sport. None of the swimmers advanced to an event final.

Ranks given are within the heat.

 Men

Water polo

Switzerland competed in the Olympic water polo tournament for the first time in 1920. A modified version of the Bergvall System was in use at the time. Switzerland lost heavily to Belgium in the opening round. Because Belgium eventually finished with the silver medal, Switzerland should have had a chance to play for the bronze; it is not clear why they did not.

 Round of 16

 Final rank 9th

Athletics

13 athletes represented Switzerland in 1920. It was the nation's fourth appearance in athletics. A pair of ninth-place finishes were the team's best results.

Ranks given are within the heat.

Boxing 

A single boxer represented Switzerland at the 1920 Games. It was the nation's debut in boxing. Reichenbach lost his first match, in the welterweight round of 16.

Fencing

Eight fencers represented Switzerland in 1920. It was the nation's fourth appearance in the sport. Switzerland competed only in the épée competitions. Edouard Fitting was the only Swiss fencer to advance to the quarterfinals, where he was eliminated. The team was much more successful than any of the individuals, advancing to the finals before finishing in fifth overall.

Ranks given are within the group.

Ice hockey

Switzerland competed in the inaugural Olympic ice hockey tournament. The team suffered the most lopsided loss of the tournament in a 29–0 defeat by the United States in the quarterfinals, Switzerland's first match. The American team's eventual winning of the silver medal qualified Switzerland for the bronze medal tournament. In the bronze medal semifinals, the Swiss played a closer game but still lost to Sweden, 4–0.

 Roster
Coach:  Max Sillig

 Gold medal quarterfinals

 Bronze medal semifinals

Final rank 5th (Tied)

Rowing

Thirteen rowers represented Switzerland in 1920. It was the nation's debut in the sport. Two of the four boats won medals, with the coxed fours team taking gold and the coxed pairs taking bronze.

Ranks given are within the heat.

Skating

Figure skating

A single figure skater represented Switzerland in 1920. It was the nation's debut in the sport. Megroz took eighth place out of nine skaters in the men's singles.

Shooting

Fifteen shooters represented Switzerland in 1920. It was the nation's third appearance in the sport, and first since 1900. The team's five bronze medals gave Switzerland the fourth-most total medals in 1920, but put them behind ten other teams who had won at least one gold or silver.

Tennis

Three tennis players, all men, competed for Switzerland in 1920. It was the nation's debut in the sport. Simon was the only one of the Swiss players to win a match; Syz and Chiesa each lost their first, as did the Simon and Syz pair in the doubles.

Weightlifting

Two weightlifters represented Switzerland in 1920. It was the nation's debut in the sport. Both men won medals, though neither was able to take a gold.

Wrestling

Four wrestlers, all in the freestyle discipline, competed for Switzerland in 1920. It was the nation's debut in the sport. Roth took the gold medal in the unlimited weight class, with Courant taking silver in the light heavyweight.

Freestyle

References

External links
 
 
International Olympic Committee results database

Nations at the 1920 Summer Olympics
1920
Olympics